Livange is a small town in the commune of Roeser, in southern Luxembourg.  , the town has a population of 292.

Roeser
Towns in Luxembourg